Nodal may refer to:

 Nodal, the adjectival form of the noun :wikt:node
 Nodal homolog, a protein encoded by the gene NODAL and responsible for left-right asymmetry
 Nodal (software), a novel music composition program
 Christian Nodal (born 1999), Mexican singer and songwriter